Joel Owsley Cheek (December 8, 1852 - December 14, 1935) was an American businessman and philanthropist. He was the founder of the Maxwell House coffee brand.

Early life
Cheek was born on December 8, 1852 in Burkesville, Kentucky. He attended Transylvania University in 1868.

Career
Cheek began his career as a school teacher for two years. He subsequently became a peripatetic salesman for the Webb Wholesale Grocery Company Tennessee and Kentucky. Cheek invested in the company, and it became known as Cheek, Webb & Co.

With investors L. T. Webb, J. J. Norton and J. W. Neal, Cheek opened a coffee shop in Downtown Nashville in 1901. They persuaded the owners of the Maxwell House Hotel to serve their coffee, and they use the name of the hotel as their coffee brand. They began using the slogan "good to the last drop" in 1917. In 1928, Cheek sold the brand to Postum Co. for $42 million; it was subsequently purchased by General Foods. However, he was featured in Maxwell House advertisements until his death.

Philanthropy

Cheek gave away much of his fortune to educational institutions, civic improvement campaigns, recognized charities and other worthy causes."

Personal life, death and legacy
Cheek married Minnie Ritchey in 1873. He had eleven children. He resided in Nashville, Tennessee: first at 513 Woodland Street in East Nashville and later 209 Louise Avenue near Centennial Park and Vanderbilt University. His cousins were the owners of Cheekwood, which later became a museum. Cheek was a Christian, and a strong advocate of prohibition. He never smoked or drank.

Cheek died on December 14, 1935 in Jacksonville, Florida. His portrait hangs in the Cumberland County Library in Burkesville, KY.

References

External links
 Joel Cheek biography at Kraft Foods Inc. (archived, 24 Jul 2003)
 Joel Cheek at Findagrave.com

1852 births
1935 deaths
People from Burkesville, Kentucky
People from Nashville, Tennessee
Transylvania University alumni
Businesspeople from Tennessee
Philanthropists from Tennessee